Donald Barrett may refer to:

Donald Barrett (businessman), American businessman
Donald Barrett (musician), American musician and drummer
Don Barrett, Australian planter and politician in Papua and New Guinea